Tron RUN/r is an endless runner video game developed by Sanzaru Games and published by Disney Interactive Studios as part of the Tron franchise. It was released on February 16, 2016 for the PlayStation 4, Xbox One, and Windows. The game was announced at the Game Awards 2015, where it was described as an "action arcade" game.

Soundtrack 
The soundtrack was written and composed by Giorgio Moroder and Raney Shockne. It was released on May 31, 2016 and included remixes from Autechre, Plaid, Rusko, Bibio, Darkstar, patten and Christopher Nicholls; most of these artists are associated with the record label Warp.

Reception 

Critical reception for Tron RUN/r has been mixed and the game currently holds a rating of 64 on Metacritic based on 9 reviews, indicating "mixed or average reviews".

References

 
 
 
 
 
 
 
 

2016 video games
Endless runner games
PlayStation 4 games
RUN/r
Video games based on films
Video games developed in the United States
Windows games
Xbox One games